Lee Kyu-Won (Korean: 이규원, Hanja: 李奎遠, born 14 February 1989) is a male judoka from South Korea, whose biggest success so far was winning the world title at the age of 19 at the 2009 World Championships in Rotterdam, Netherlands.

References

External links
 
 2009 Summer Universiade Profile

1989 births
Living people
Asian Games medalists in judo
Judoka at the 2010 Asian Games
Judoka at the 2014 Asian Games
South Korean male judoka
Asian Games gold medalists for South Korea
Asian Games bronze medalists for South Korea
Medalists at the 2010 Asian Games
Medalists at the 2014 Asian Games
21st-century South Korean people